The Montauban Ladies Open is a women's professional golf tournament played as part of the LET Access Series, held since 2019 at Golf de Montauban L'Estang in Montauban, France.

In 2021, French amateur Marine Griffaut, a member of Texas State Bobcats women's golf team, earned her first professional win.

Winners

References

External links

LET Access Series events
Golf tournaments in France
Recurring sporting events established in 2019
2019 establishments in France